Theliderma metanevra, common name the monkeyface, is a species of freshwater mussel, an aquatic bivalve mollusk in the family Unionidae, the river mussels.

It is native to the eastern United States, where it lives in large to medium-sized rivers. Although it has been extirpated from certain sections of its range, it is still widespread and fairly common.

References

Fauna of the Southeastern United States
Critically endangered fauna of the United States
metanerva
Bivalves described in 1820
Taxa named by Constantine Samuel Rafinesque